Haunted is an American horror drama television series that first aired on September 24, 2002 on UPN. The program, which was filmed in Vancouver, was canceled on November 5, 2002 due to low ratings. As a result, only seven of the completed episodes were aired on UPN. However, all eleven filmed episodes have been shown in later airings of the show.

Plot
Police officer Frank Taylor had the perfect job and perfect family. After his son's unsolved abduction, his life, marriage and career disintegrate.  He leaves the force to become a private investigator specializing in missing and abducted children cases.  His ex-wife has come to terms with the loss of their child, but Frank is obsessed with one day finding their son.

One day Frank's life is forever changed while trying to apprehend Simon, a man linked to several child abductions who eludes the police. A fatal clash leaves Simon dead and Frank in critical condition. As the doctors try to save his life, Frank has a near-death experience in which he sees his missing son.

When Frank regains consciousness, he finds that the dead can communicate with him, and that their confusing and frightening manifestations are usually intended to help him in his work.  Some of the dead however—including Simon—abuse his new abilities to intentionally mislead or harm him.

Cast

 Matthew Fox as Frank Taylor
 Russell Hornsby as Marcus Bradshaw
 John Mann as Simon Dunn
 Lynn Collins as Jessica Manning
 Michael Irby as Dante
 Bree Michael Warner as Anna

Broadcast and syndication
In September 2007, the series began airing on Sci Fi. In 2009, Chiller began airing this program as part of their daily marathon line-up. It plays there sporadically. A marathon of the entire series ran all day on October 31, 2010 on Universal HD.

Home media
Phase 4 Films released the complete series on DVD on April 13, 2010.

On May 29, 2018, Kino Lorber released Haunted–The Complete Series on Blu-ray for the first time.

Episodes

Ratings

See also
 List of ghost films

References

External links
 

2002 American television series debuts
2002 American television series endings
2000s American drama television series
2000s American horror television series
English-language television shows
Television series about ghosts
Television series by CBS Studios
Television shows filmed in Vancouver
Television shows set in Seattle
UPN original programming